It Had to Be You! (後備甜心) is a 2006 Hong Kong romantic comedy film featuring the directorial debuts of Maurice Li and Andrew Loo, starring Ekin Cheng and Karena Lam.

Plot
Restaurant supervisor Jill (Karena Lam) has a handsome boyfriend, Chi-on (Hu Bing), but she is just his backup girlfriend. She knows she is the other girl, but her hope for being his one and only has never ceased until he changes his formal girlfriend once again. All her anger goes to her co-worker, Jack (Ekin Cheng), who appears to be a womanizer but indeed shares a similar unfortunate romantic situation of being the backup boyfriend of an airhostess. Knowing that both are victims in romantic relationships, Jack and Jill no longer spar with each other and a liking between them start to develop.

Cast
 Karena Lam as Jill so
 Ekin Cheng as Jack
 Eric Tsang as Jason
 Hu Bing as Wai Chi-on
 Bobo Chan as Grace
 Nicola Cheung as Moon
 Yan Ng as Apple
 Derek Tsang as Pie
 Fire Lee as Fatty
 Kristal Tin as Lisa
 Chin Ka-lok as Big guy
 Hiro Hayama as Sung Tsing-yeung
 Benz Hui as Jacob
 Kiki Sheung as Jill's mother
 Siu Keung as Fluffy
 Lo Mang as Fireman
 Kwok Wing-nam as Chi-on's friend
 Eric Li as Chi-on's friend
 Lau Sam-yi as Chi-on's friend
 Ng Wang-hung as Chi-on's friend
 Chan Man-chung as Violin teacher
 Yan Man-yee as Office lady A
 Lo Sau-wai as Office lady B
 Choi Jing-man as Office lady C
 Stephen Tsui as Jason's friend
 Chiu Chiu-wai as Jason's friend
 Guthrie Yip as Jill's friend
 Kitty Ho as Jill's friend 
 Benjamin Yuen as Jill's friend
 Yau Wing-yan as Jill's friend
 Leung Ho-ming as Taxi driver
 Chan Hung as Kissing couple
 Woo Hiu-sam as Kissing couple
 Hui Siu-to as Jill's old security
 Ding Chu-wai as Antique shop manager
 Pauline Yeung as Supermarket staff
 Poon King-lam as Bridesmaid
 Chan Wing-kei as Bridesmaid
 Cheung Chan-kit as Best man
 Wong Kwok-man as Best Man
 Chan Chun-shan as Hip-Hop guy
 Chan Chun-chung as Hip-Hop guy
 Lam Kam-yuen as Hip-Hop guy
 Ting Ling-ling as Jason's wife

See also
 List of Hong Kong films

External links 
 

2005 films
2005 romantic comedy films
Hong Kong romantic comedy films
2000s Cantonese-language films
Films about weddings
Films set in Hong Kong
Films shot in Hong Kong
2005 directorial debut films
2000s Hong Kong films